Morris Boyd (June 9, 1905 – February 10, 1986) was a former member of the Ohio House of Representatives.

References

1905 births
Republican Party members of the Ohio House of Representatives
1986 deaths
20th-century American politicians
People from Callaway County, Missouri